Ikirt House, in East Liverpool, Ohio, was built in 1888. The house is an example of a variety of architectural styles including Second Empire, Eastlake movement, and elements of Queen Anne style architecture. The house was listed in the National Register of Historic Places in May 1980.

Dr. George P. Ikirt (1852-1927) was a surgeon in East Liverpool. He was prominent in Democratic politics and served in the United States House of Representatives from 1893 to 1895.

References

Houses on the National Register of Historic Places in Ohio
Second Empire architecture in Ohio
Queen Anne architecture in Ohio
Houses completed in 1888
Houses in Columbiana County, Ohio
National Register of Historic Places in Columbiana County, Ohio
East Liverpool, Ohio